Paenarthrobacter is a genus of bacteria from the family Micrococcaceae.

Paenarthrobacter members share the following properties:
 A3a type peptidoglycan
 Menaquinone MK-9(H2)
 A polar lipid profile composed primarily of diphosphatidylglycerol, phosphatidylglycerol, phosphatidylinositol, dimannosylglyceride, and monogalactosyldiacylglycerol; and to a lesser extent, trimannosyldiacylglycerol.
 A fatty acid composition primarily from anteiso-C15:0, and to a lesser extent iso-C15:0, iso-C16:0, anteiso-C17:0 and isoC14. 
 A genomic GC content in the range of 61.3–62.5 mol%.

References

External links
 

Micrococcaceae